The Party of Democratic Reformers (Partito dei Riformatori Democratici, PRD) was a minor social-democratic political party in Italy.

It was founded in June 2007 by Renato D'Andria, leader of the left-wing faction within the Italian Democratic Socialist Party (PSDI), after his attempt to take over the party earlier in 2007 was declared illegal in April by a tribunal in Rome. In September 2008 D'Andria appealed to the Supreme Court of Cassation in order to be re-established as leader of PSDI. In July 2011 D'Andria was declared as the legitimate secretary of the PSDI, thus ending the PRD's experience. D'Andria would lead the PSDI from 2011 to 2022.

References

External links
Official website

Defunct political parties in Italy
Political parties established in 2007